The sixth season of American Idol premiered on the Fox Broadcasting Company as a two-night, four-hour premiere special on January 16 and 17, and ran until May 23, 2007. Simon Cowell, Paula Abdul, and Randy Jackson returned to judge once again, and Ryan Seacrest returned as host.  A new record of 74 million votes were cast in the finale round, and a new record of 609 million votes were cast in the entire season (the seasonal total record was surpassed by the tenth season and the finale vote record was broken by the eleventh season). Jordin Sparks won the competition with Blake Lewis as the first runner-up and Melinda Doolittle finishing third. Jordin Sparks is also the youngest winner of the competition, winning at age 17, as well as the first winner from outside the Southern United States. Sparks remained the last female winner until the twelfth season.

Regional auditions
The Auditions were held in the following cities:

Auditioning contestants were required to be between the ages 16 and 28 on August 6, 2006 (born between August 7, 1977, and August 6, 1990). Guest judges were used for audition this season.

Guest judges –
Jewel – Minneapolis audition
Carole Bayer Sager – New York audition
Olivia Newton-John – Los Angeles audition

Many of the people who auditioned had trouble with the double doors, with many often going towards the wrong door on their way out; this was spoofed by Idol later in the season with "audition footage" featuring Tony Bennett. This did not seem to be a problem for the seventh season as both doors were accessible.

An elderly man named Sherman Pore auditioned in Los Angeles this year after a successful petition drive to convince the producers to waive the age-limit rule so he can audition.  He explained that he did it to ease the pain and suffering of his female companion who was dying of cancer, but had died shortly before he can audition before the judges.  He later released an album for the benefit of cancer research.  Another contestant that year was Melissa Sgambelluri, also known as "Fountain girl" for her appearance in the promo and opening sequence celebrating in a fountain after winning her golden ticket.

Jordin Sparks, the eventual winner this season, failed to pass through her audition in Los Angeles, but later won an audition in Seattle as a reward for winning a local Fox-affiliate-sponsored contest called Arizona Idol.

Hollywood week
The Hollywood rounds of the audition process were held over four days in November 2006 at the Orpheum Theatre in Los Angeles.

The first round consisted of each contestant singing one song a capella of their own choosing in front of the judges and all the other contestants of the same gender. Contestants were then told whether they were moving on or going home, in groups of six. This extended over the first two days, first females, then males.

The second round took place on the second and third day, and consisted of groups of three or four contestants choosing, rehearsing, and then performing one of nine pre-selected songs. Groups were reviewed and contestants were then judged individually as to whether they were moving on or going home.

The third round took place on the fourth day, and consisted of individual contestants performing a song from a pre-selected list, accompanied by a piano and backup singers. Contestants were again informed of whether they had made the cut or not.

Green mile 
The final pre-audience voting cut down took place at the Pasadena Civic Center on January 14 or 15, 2007, just before the regional audition shows began airing. Without any further auditioning, but possibly with some audience research having taken place, the 40 remaining contestants were reduced to 24. In a process taking a whole day, contestants waited in a sitting room until one by one, they went up an elevator and took a long walk to the other end of the Center's Gold Room. Then the three judges told them whether they have made it onto the stage show or are cut.  Those cut at this phase included the "fountain girl" in the opening credits, Melissa Sgambelluri.

The 24 semifinalists were announced February 14, 2007.

Semifinals

The semifinals began on February 20. There were three shows each week for the three weeks of the semifinals. The February 20 through May 16 shows originated from CBS Television City in Hollywood.

The live show portion of the semifinals began on February 20, 2007, with the names announced on February 14, 2007. Starting with 12 women and 12 men, the women and men perform on weekly separate shows and on the result shows, and the bottom two contestants each night are eliminated from the competition. The semifinals took place over three weeks, meaning that six from each gender will be eliminated over the course of the competition, leaving the other six to form the top 12. The females performed on the first night, followed by the males thereafter.

Semifinalists
Females
Sabrina Sloan (born October 31, 1979) is originally from Mission Viejo, California but now calls Studio City, California her home. Sloan toured the United States as part of the Broadway musical Hairspray under her maiden name, Sabrina Scherff. She earned her bachelor's degree from Northwestern University in Musical Theatre and Communication Studies. She was later signed to a recording contract with Universal Music Group, as part of a duet with Sundance Head. She was also part of the First National Tour cast with another Broadway musical, In The Heights.
 Antonella Barba  (born November 26, 1986) auditioned with her best friend Amanda Coluccio and made it to Hollywood. An undergraduate at The Catholic University of America, she is originally from Point Pleasant, New Jersey. She made it to Round 3 with Coluccio and both passed the group round (although their third member, Baylie Brown, did not). Coluccio was eliminated in the cut for the top 40. While Barba appeared on the show, racy photographs of her emerged, including photographs of Barba topless along with other women on a beach. A full segment concerning the controversy on multiple episodes of MSNBC's Countdown with Keith Olbermann (as recent as March 2007). Photos of Barba posing in a wet T-shirt in the fountain of the National World War II Memorial in Washington, D.C. also surfaced; however, Barba's friend Coluccio has stated that the sexually explicit photos were fake. Barba is currently a non-partisan spokesperson for ElectionMall's Voter Space.
Leslie Hunt  (born March 23, 1982) is from Chicago, who was featured in an American Idol commercial before Season 6 started. She is a self-described indie rocker. She suffers from the autoimmune disease lupus. She is currently the lead singer for progressive rock band District 97.
Alaina Alexander  (born July 21, 1982) auditioned in Los Angeles. She is from West Hollywood, California. Before her American Idol 6 audition, Alexander revealed that after struggling for six years to make it in the music business in Los Angeles she had decided she was not going to sing anymore and had decided to go to college instead.  She considered American Idol to be her last chance to pursue a singing career. For her Los Angeles audition,  Alexander sang "Feeling Good" by Michael Bublé.
Nicole Tranquillo   (born August 13, 1985) is from Wernersville, Pennsylvania. She gained a vocal major at the University of the Arts. She auditioned in Memphis. 
Amy Krebs   (born May 2, 1984) is from Federal Way, Washington. She is fluent in German. She auditioned in Seattle.

Males
 Jason "Sundance" Head  (born July 9, 1978) auditioned in Memphis and lives in Porter, Texas. He is the son of Roy Head, who had a number-two single with "Treat Her Right" in 1965; the song was second on the charts to The Beatles, which Jason said made his dad dislike them. He sang the classic hit "Stormy Monday". He later became a contestant on NBC's eleventh season of The Voice and won the competition as a member of Team Blake.
 Jared Cotter  (born June 17, 1981) is from Kew Gardens, New York (listed as Long Island on the show) and attended Newfield High School. He auditioned in New York City. Cotter played basketball in college, but quit to start his music career. His rendition of "Let's Get It On" dedicated to his parents was named one of VH1's most memorable reality moments.  Cotter also worked with singer-songwriter Jay Sean, featuring in the album My Own Way and co-writing the Billboard number one song "Down".
Adrian Joseph "A.J." Tabaldo  (born January 3, 1986) auditioned in Los Angeles and is from Santa Maria, California. Tabaldo is half-Filipino and half-Portuguese, and auditioned for American Idol five times.
Nicholas "Nick" Pedro  (born July 9, 1981) auditioned in New York and is from Taunton, Massachusetts. Pedro dropped out of the competition the previous season after forgetting the lyrics of "Buttercup" in Hollywood. This audition, he gave a soulful rendition of "Fly Me to the Moon" which earned him a second chance to fulfill his Idol aspirations. Nick's feat seemed especially noteworthy as, unlike all other contestants making it this far, Nick received no experience ever onstage prior to Idol.
Rudy Cardenas  (born April 3, 1978) auditioned in Seattle and is from North Hollywood, California. Originally from Venezuela, he is part of a Los Angeles-based band called M-Pact. In his audition, he sang Journey rock classic "Open Arms". Although Simon was unimpressed with his singing, Rudy made it to Hollywood with the support of the other two judges. In Hollywood, he sang "How Deep Is Your Love" together with Chris Sligh, Blake Lewis, and Tom Lowe in group round. The judges were impressed by their vocals.
Paul Kim (born March 26, 1981) auditioned in Los Angeles. He is from Saratoga, California, and attended Monta Vista High School. Kim, being Korean-American, his motivation for auditioning was to alter the stereotypical Asian image that William Hung gave during the previous seasons. His performance received unanimous praise from the judges as Randy mentioned that Kim has one of the best male vocals he has heard this season. In contrast to their early praise, the judges mentioned when they put him through that Paul made it to the top 24 by "a split decision". He sang barefoot during all of his performances. He is also known as P. Keys.

Performances
Color key:

Top 24

Top 20

Top 16

Finalists 

The 12 finalists were announced on March 8, 2007. As in past years, the top 12 will appear on the annual compilation album while the top 10 will be the participants in the American Idol summer concert tour. Also as in past years, one finalist was eliminated every week, with the exception of the April 25 show, when all contestants were declared safe. As a result, two of the participants were eliminated on the May 2, 2007, results program.

The following is first in reverse chronological order by elimination date, then in alphabetical order by family name, where applicable.

Finals
There are 11 weeks of finals and 12 contestants compete and one finalist eliminated per week based on the American public's votes. The exception was on the Top 6 week, where the first week being non-elimination and the following week was a double-elimination.

Color key:

Top 12 – Diana Ross 
Diana Ross served as the guest mentor this week.

Top 11 – British Invasion 
British singers Peter Noone and Lulu served as the guest mentors this week.

Top 10 – No Doubt/Songs That Inspired Gwen Stefani 
Gwen Stefani served as the guest mentor this week.

Top 9 – American Classics 
Tony Bennett served as the guest mentor this week

Top 8 – Latin 
Jennifer Lopez, who would go on to become a future judge of the show, served as the guest mentor this week.

Top 7 – Country 
Martina McBride served as the guest mentor this week.

Top 6 (first week) – Inspirational Songs (Idol Gives Back) 
Owning to a special theme week, Idol Gives Back, Seacrest announced that the week was a non-elimination, and that the votes cast for this week will be rolled over to the following week's performances.

Top 6 (second week) – Bon Jovi 
With the previous week's being non-elimination, votes were accumulative on both last week and this week shows and the two contestants receiving the two fewest count of votes at the end of this round were eliminated. Bon Jovi and David Bryan served as guest mentors this week.

Top 4 – Barry Gibb 
For the first time this season, contestants performed two songs. Barry Gibb served as the guest mentor this week.

Top 3 – Judge's Choice, Producer's choice, Contestant's Choice 
The contestants sang three songs determined by the judges, the producers, and themselves.

Top 2 – Contestant's Choice, Previous Song, Winner's single

Grand Finale
The Grand Finale of season 6 aired on May 23, 2007, live from the Kodak Theatre in Los Angeles. Jordin Sparks was announced as the winner at 10:05pm EDT (the show ran over its allotted time), with Blake Lewis as the runner-up.

Guest performers included Smokey Robinson, BeBe & CeCe Winans, Gladys Knight and Tony Bennett.  Every past winner of Idol also performed, except for Fantasia Barrino who was appearing in The Color Purple in New York City.

After Carrie Underwood performed "I'll Stand by You", Clive Davis gave a speech extolling the state of "the American Idol album franchise", then presented Underwood with a special award for achieving 6 million U.S. album sales for her album Some Hearts.

Performances
 Blake Lewis and Jordin Sparks sang "I Saw Her Standing There".
 Gwen Stefani sang "4 in the Morning" via satellite.
 Kelly Clarkson sang "Never Again".
Top 6 male finalists sing "Ooo Baby Baby", then are joined by Smokey Robinson for a medley of "Being with You" and "The Tears of a Clown".
Blake Lewis beatboxed with Doug E. Fresh, performing variations upon "The Show".
Top 6 female finalists sing "I Heard It Through the Grapevine", then are joined by Gladys Knight to sing a medley of "I Feel a Song (In My Heart)" and "Midnight Train to Georgia".
 Tony Bennett sang "For Once in My Life".
 Melinda Doolittle sang "Hold Up the Light" with BeBe and CeCe Winans, with whom she used to sing backup.
The 12 finalists sang "Time After Time" in a Ford music video which featured outtakes of the previous music videos.
 Carrie Underwood sang her charity single "I'll Stand by You".
The African Children's Choir performed.
 Sanjaya Malakar performed "You Really Got Me" with Joe Perry of Aerosmith as well as an appearance by "The Crying Girl", Ashley Ferl.
 Green Day performed their charity single "Working Class Hero".
 Taylor Hicks sang "Heaven Knows".
 Ruben Studdard, with Jordin Sparks, sang "You're All I Need to Get By".
 Bette Midler sang "Wind Beneath My Wings".
An ensemble tribute to Sgt. Pepper's Lonely Hearts Club Band with the past Idol winners as well as the top 12.  Included were portions of "Sgt. Pepper's Lonely Hearts Club Band" featuring Kelly Clarkson and Joe Perry, "A Day in the Life" featuring Taylor Hicks, "She's Leaving Home" featuring Carrie Underwood, "Lucy in the Sky with Diamonds" featuring Ruben Studdard, and "With a Little Help from My Friends" from the top 12.
Jordin Sparks performed the songwriter contest winning single "This Is My Now" after the announcement of her victory.

Elimination chart
Color key:

American Idol songwriter contest
On the April 3, 2007, show, Ryan Seacrest announced the first American Idol Songwriter: a songwriting contest. Following an open online submission process where over 25,000 submissions were received, twenty songs were selected for competition by Simon Fuller and A&R representatives of his 19 Entertainment. Beginning May 2, 2007, and ending May 8, 2007, with "one online vote per fan", the American public were able to listen to snippets from each song and rated them on a scale from 1 (lowest) to 10 (highest) on the American Idol Songwriter website. On the May 22, 2007, show, the two finalists performed the winning song, "This Is My Now". The song was released as a single by Jordin Sparks, the winner of American Idol Season 6.

The titles of the twenty songs are:

"Close to Me" – Michael Doane and AnneMarie Milazzo
"Forever Starts Today" – Erin Boheme and CJ Vanston
"If You Ask Me To" – Jennifer Hamady and Shedrick Mitchell
"I'm Going to Be Me" – Lane Lenhart
"In Your Eyes" – Colin Armstrong
"I Saw Stars" – Reed Waddle
"Lost (Without You)" – Cal Harris, Jr.
"Love Me till the Lonely's Gone" – Michael Patzig and Tracey Naples
"The Next Big Thing" – Ray Grant and Sam Sims
"One Night" – Kelley Hill

"Right Here with Me" – Kelli Trontell and Don Gatlin
"Secrets and Lies" – Drew Yowell and Byron Zanos
"Send Me on My Way" – Matthew Rogers and Scott Young
"Someday" – Nelson Kole
"This Is My Now" – Jeff Peabody and Scott Krippayne – Contest Winner
"Tonight" – Kelly Corsino
"Waking in a Dream" – R. J. Martinez and Stacy Hogan
"When You Need a Moment" – Christie Leigh
"With All the Love Your Heart Can Hold" – Robin Randall and Diana De Witt
"You Never Gave Up on Me" – Billy Aerts and Burton Collins

Controversies
There was controversy surrounding the judges' comments over the audition of a Special Olympics participant named Jonathan Jayne. American Idol producer Ken Warwick responded saying that "It's not a conscious decision, It's just that the further we go in the series, there are less and less good singers, so the numbers are made up by more bad ones." Warwick said that he thinks everyone has the right to audition, and added that in some instances when there are singers with certain disabilities who just want to meet the judges, the producers will "turn the cameras off and bring them in. We give them a good experience."
A series of provocative photos surfaced on the Internet of Season 6 Top 24 Contestant Antonella Barba.
Teenager Sanjaya Malakar was seen as the season's most polarizing and talked about American Idol contestant, as he continued to survive elimination for several weeks. The weblog Vote for the Worst and satellite radio personality Howard Stern both encouraged fans to vote for Sanjaya. However, on April 18, after over 38 million votes, Sanjaya was voted off.
On Tuesday, April 17, 2007, the day after the Virginia Tech massacre, in which a student named Seung-Hui Cho used guns to kill 32 students and professors before committing suicide, while contestant Chris Richardson and Ryan Seacrest were discussing the shooting after Chris's critique, Simon Cowell apparently appeared to be rolling his eyes at the incident, when he was actually speaking to Paula Abdul and did not hear what Chris had said. On the results show the next day, Cowell stated: "I may not be the nicest person in the world, but I would never, ever, ever, disrespect those families or those victims, and I felt it was important to set the record straight." To clear Cowell's name, a video was shown on the result show which showed Cowell and Abdul talking with an inset of Chris and Seacrest discussing the shooting. Also, Seacrest began the performance show by acknowledging what had happened the day before.
 Fans and critics alike were stunned at Melinda Doolittle's departure. Simon Cowell admitted that the sixth season's crown should have rightfully gone to Melinda. Executive producer Nigel Lythgoe responded, noting that "[Idol producers] were so engrossed with the mentors and didn't really focus on the Melinda Doolittles of the show."
During the finale, the show went over its scheduled 2-hour time limit and ended at 10:09 PM EST; the previous two seasons' finales also ran over time. As a result, many users who recorded the program on DVRs reported that as recordings of the broadcast concluded at the program's scheduled end time of 10:00PM, they missed the announcement of the winner. Fox executives issued an apology, and a TiVo spokesperson advised users to "pad" recordings of live broadcasts by adding several minutes of extra recording time "as insurance".

Reception

U.S. Nielsen ratings 

Live + same day ratings

American Idol ended the season as the top show of the 2006–2007 TV season. Its Wednesday episodes ranked first with an average of 30.02 million viewers, followed by the Tuesday episodes which averaged 29.54 million. The premiere episode became the series' highest rated debut episode, viewed by 37.44 million viewers and receiving a 15.8/36 Nielsen rating in the Adult 18-49 demographic.

Live + 7 day (DVR) ratings

Critical response

Awards and nominations

Related programming

American Idol Extra (season 2)

American Idol Extra, a behind-the-scenes show, also returned for a second season, corresponding with the start of the finals in March. It aired Thursdays on Fox Reality.

Idol Gives Back 2007

On the March 8, 2007, results show, Ryan Seacrest announced an initiative to give back to people in poverty in both Africa and the United States (including those affected by Hurricane Katrina). The event took place over two episodes of the series. For every vote cast immediately following the April 24, 2007, broadcast, many sponsors donated funds to the Charity Projects Entertainment Fund. The fund will distribute the money raised to many charities in the US as well as in Africa. News Corporation pledged to donate 10 cents for every vote made to the show for the first 50 million calls, that is, up to $5 million. MySpace created a special profile page for the event in order to spread the word. Donations from viewers were accepted by phone and website during the April 25, 2007, results show, in a manner similar to a telethon. Near the end of the broadcast, Seacrest announced the show raised 30 million US dollars, with the final tally coming on May 1, 2007. As of May 1, 2007, over $70 million has been raised as a result of Idol Gives Back.

Between contestant performances, video vignettes showing the judges and Seacrest visiting and observing squalid conditions in Africa and the United States were aired. Similar vignettes were aired during the results show. For this special, the voting period was doubled to four hours following the show, rather than the usual two. In response to the anticipated call volume, each contestant was assigned two toll free numbers. Over 70 million votes were cast.

The results show was broadcast from two locations—the regular American Idol stage and Walt Disney Concert Hall—and included many celebrity actors and personalities. The show also included numerous performers; for a full list of performances, see the main article. Ellen DeGeneres co-hosted the event from the Disney Hall stage. Proceeds from ticket sales benefited the fund. Videos of the results show's performances are available for purchase on iTunes, with proceeds going to charity.

Due to the "charity" theme of the show, no contestant was eliminated on the April 25 results show. This was a surprise both to viewers, to whom Seacrest promised the "most shocking elimination ever", and to the contestants.  When Ryan Seacrest was about to eliminate Jordin Sparks he said since it was a charity night none of the contestants were voted off, and the votes from that week were added to the votes from the following week to eliminate two singers. Both weeks saw a two-hour extension of the regular two-hour voting window, and in the end, the two-week combined voting totaled 135 million votes.

Idol Chat (season 3)

TV Guide Channel aired its third season of Idol Chat.

Idol Tonight (season 2)

TV Guide Channel brought back a second season of Idol Tonight, the live pre-show to American Idol, which aired on Wednesdays starting in March. The show features former Idol runner-up Justin Guarini as a correspondent along with Kimberly Caldwell and Rosanna Tavarez.

International broadcasts

UK edition

For the UK back-to-back repeat of the performance and results shows on the following Friday night on ITV2, Cat Deeley presents additional sections preceding and following each commercial break, and follows the end of the show with a short interview with that week's eliminated contestant.

Music releases

Music releases

Unlike previous seasons the top 12 compilation album did not come out while the show was airing. The top 12 recorded studio versions of each of the songs they sang on the show. The songs were available for purchase on AmericanIdol.com as digital downloads through the night of the finale.  Sparks' and Lewis' songs (except Sparks' "Livin' on a Prayer") remained available on the Idol website and iTunes Store through June 20, 2007,.

Originally, a collage of the finalists' head shots from the top 24 photo shoot was used as album art on AmericanIdol.com, with the title American Idol 6: Greatest Moments; at present, the covers of Sparks' and Lewis' EPs are used instead. The American Idol: Season 6 – "Greatest Hits" & "The Collector's Edition" were eventually released on June 12, 2007, on iTunes/Americanidol.com. This is the only season that the season's collection is not distributed by Sony BMG/RCA Records.

Sparks' first non-American Idol single was the top hit (peaking at number eight) "Tattoo", which received platinum certification. Her second single was the Billboard Hot 100 number three hit "No Air" with Chris Brown. The song went to number one in several countries, and also topped Billboard's Pop Airplay chart. "No Air" had been certified platinum in April but recently passed the 3 million copies mark. It stands as the bestselling single by any Idol contestant. Sparks released a third single off her album, "One Step at a Time", which peaked at number 17. "One Step at a Time" has so far sold over a million copies and is certified platinum. Sparks released her second album Battlefield in July 2009. The album's title track became Jordin's fifth top 20 hit on the Billboard Hot 100, peaking at number 10. This makes Jordin Sparks the only American Idol contestant to have their first five singles become Top 20 Hits.

Blake Lewis's first single was "Break Anotha!", which failed to chart on the Billboard Hot 100. His second single, "How Many Words", also failed to chart on the Billboard Hot 100, peaking at number 25 in the Bubbling Under chart (Hot 100 equivalent = 125). Shortly afterward, Lewis confirmed that he had been dropped by Arista records. His album sales are just over 300,000. The drop also canceled his apparent plans for a third single release.

"This Is My Now" as performed by Jordin Sparks was released as a radio single. It debuted on the Billboard Hot 100 chart at number 15.

On May 24, 2007, the winner Jordin Sparks and runner-up Blake Lewis released five-song EPs on iTunes Store; though only iTunes calls them "EPs", they are also available as "bundles" for the same price on AmericanIdol.com through June 20, 2007.

Sparks' EP contained the winner's single, "This Is My Now", as well as four songs she performed on Idol: "I (Who Have Nothing)", "A Broken Wing", "To Love Somebody", and "Wishing on a Star".

Lewis' EP did not contain "This Is My Now"; all of the tracks were songs he performed on the show: "You Give Love a Bad Name", "Time of the Season", "I Need to Know", "Love Song", and "When the Stars Go Blue".

On June 12, 2007, Apple released five song EPs for the rest of the top 12 finalists (Melinda Doolittle, LaKisha Jones, Chris Richardson, Phil Stacey, Sanjaya Malakar, Haley Scarnato, Gina Glocksen, Chris Sligh, Stephanie Edwards and Brandon Rogers) along with the compilation album as a collector's edition of the season's songs. Each of the songs are also available for individual purchase.

Phil Stacey, tied for fifth place with Chris Richardson, is now signed to Lyric Street and has released his first single "If You Didn't Love Me". Richardson recently produced his first single, "All Alone". Tenth place finalist Chris Sligh recently released a Christian album after signing with Brash Music.

Jordin Sparks
Jordin Sparks
Battlefield (Jordin Sparks)Blake LewisA.D.D. (Audio Day Dream) (Blake Lewis)Heartbreak on Vinyl (Blake Lewis)

Melinda DoolittleComing Back to You (Melinda Doolittle)My Funny Valentine (Melinda Doolittle)

LaKisha JonesSo Glad I'm Me (LaKisha Jones)Chris RichardsonAll AlonePhil StaceyPhil StaceyInto the LightSanjaya MalakarDancing to the Music in my Head (EP)

Chris SlighRunning Back To You (Chris Sligh)Stephanie EdwardsOn Our Way (single)Here I Am (single)

Leslie Hunt
"From the Strange to a Stranger"
"Your Hair Is on Fire"
"Wait for It"

Amanda ColuccioFly Away (single)Now That I Found You (single)

Sarah BurgessDidn't Matter That (single)One 

Sean MichelThe Thrill of HopeSherman PoreFor My Lady Love'' 

Source – IdolsMusic.com

Concert tour
 American Idols LIVE! Tour 2007

References

External links
Official American Idol Contestants Website
 

American Idol seasons
2007 American television seasons